Richard O. Miller (1875 - June 11, 1930) was an American jockey and a trainer of two National Champion Thoroughbred racehorses.

In 1890 Richard Miller went to work as an exercise rider for the prominent stable owner Michael F. Dwyer. He would ride for the stable for a short time before choosing to learn the business of training Thoroughbreds under the very capable Hardy Campbell Jr. In June 1895 Hardy Campbell Jr. died and Richard Miller took over.

The best horses Miller trained were Champions Africander and Eyelid. He trained Africander for Hampton Stable, the nom de course of the racing partnership of Simon Deimel & Charles F. Dwyer who purchased the colt on June 28, 1902. With Africander, Miller won the 1903 Belmont Stakes, a major racing event that became the third leg of the U.S. Triple Crown series. Africander would be named American Champion Three-Year-Old Horse for 1903. 

Eyelid was owned by Anthony L. Aste and would be named the American Champion Three-Year-Old Filly for 1918 when her most important wins came in the Alabama Stakes and the Ladies Handicap.

References

1875 births
1930 deaths
American horse trainers
Sportspeople from Brooklyn